Undibacterium seohonense is a Gram-negative, aerobic and motile bacterium from the genus of Undibacterium which has been isolated from water from the Seoho Lake from Suwon in Korea.

References

Burkholderiales
Bacteria described in 2014